Juniperus coahuilensis, commonly known as redberry juniper, is a species of conifer in the family Cupressaceae.

Description
It is usually multi-trunked. The bark is brown to gray, exfoliating in long strips on mature trunks and branches.

The leaves are green to light green, and have glands that can produce a white crystalline exudate.
 
The cones are a fleshy glaucous yellow-orange to dark red,  in diameter, and mature in one year.

This species is unusual in that it sprouts from the stump when cut or burned, which has probably allowed it to remain in the grasslands in spite of periodic grass fires that kill all other juniper species.

Fossil record
The species is known to have been present during the Late Wisconsin Glacial Episode of the last glacial period, in North American latitudes defined by fossils from the Waterman Mountains in present-day Arizona.

Distribution
The shrubby tree is found in northern Mexico and areas of the Southwestern United States within central and southeastern Arizona, southwestern New Mexico, and West Texas including Big Bend National Park.

In Mexico, it can also occur in canyons or alluvial fans. In the Chihuahuan Desert and Sonoran Desert ecoregions, it often in association with Opuntia spp. and/or Yucca spp.

References

coahuilensis
Trees of Northeastern Mexico
Trees of Northwestern Mexico
Flora of Arizona
Flora of Coahuila
Flora of Jalisco
Flora of New Mexico
Flora of Texas
Flora of the Chihuahuan Desert
Flora of the Sonoran Deserts
Trees of the South-Central United States
Trees of the Southwestern United States
Least concern flora of North America
Least concern flora of the United States
Taxonomy articles created by Polbot
Plants described in 1946